Armand Gatti (26 January 1924 – 6 April 2017) was a French playwright, poet, journalist, screenwriter, filmmaker and World War II resistance fighter. His debut film Enclosure was entered into the 2nd Moscow International Film Festival where he won the Silver Prize for Best Director. Two years later, his film El Otro Cristóbal was entered into the 1963 Cannes Film Festival.

In 2013 he was awarded the Grand prix du théâtre de l'Académie française.

Biography
One of the most acclaimed theater writer/directors of the 20th century, Gatti was originally a member of the informal Left Bank group of filmmakers that included Alain Resnais, Chris Marker, Agnès Varda, Henri Colpi and Jean Cayrol, but because none of his films have been released on video in the US, he remains an elusive figure for many cinephiles. He appears in Resnais' Toute la mémoire du monde (1956) and in Marker's Immemory CD-Rom; he wrote China (1956) for Marker's Petite Planète collection and traveled with Marker in the making of Letter from Siberia (1957), which inspired his book Siberia — Zero + Infinity the following year.

According to his 1989 biographer, Dorothy Knowles, Gatti was born in 1924 in a shantytown in Monaco to Auguste Rainier an Italian anarchist from Piedmont, who escaped murder in a Chicago slaughterhouse because of his political activities and fled Benito Mussolini's regime and to Letizia Lusona a maid. During World War II, Gatti joined a small French resistance maquis. Captured, tortured, and sentenced to a concentration camp in Hamburg where he was forced to work in a diving bell at the bottom of the Baltic Sea, Gatti eventually escaped and joined a British Special Air Service special forces team. After the war, he worked as an award-winning journalist for many years until he traveled with Marker, published his first plays, and directed his first film, Enclosure (L'Enclos, 1961).

L'Enclos was screened out of competition at the Cannes Film Festival but it was hailed by Truffaut, Resnais, Cocteau and others.

He was awarded the French Legion of Honour in 1999, the Ordre des Arts et des Lettres in 2004 and the Grand prix du théâtre from the Académie française in 2013.

He died on 6 April 2017.

Theatrical works
1957 Le Poisson noir (awarded Fénéon Prize)
1966 Chant public devant deux chaises électriques

Filmography
1960 Moranbong, une aventure coréenne (writer only)
1961 Enclosure 
1963 El Otro Cristóbal
1968 Das imaginäre Leben des Straßenkehrers Auguste G.  (writer only)
1970 Der Übergang über den Ebro
1983 Nous étions tous des noms d'arbres

References

Sources
 Banham, Martin, ed. 1998. The Cambridge Guide to Theatre. Cambridge: Cambridge UP. .

External links
 Official site

[Biography (in French) http://www.armand-gatti.org/index.php?cat=biographie]
[DVD http://www.editionsmontparnasse.fr/p1364/Le-Lion-sa-cage-et-ses-ailes-DVD]
Gatti passed away at the Begin Hospital in Vincennes on Thursday, April 6th.

1924 births
2017 deaths
20th-century French dramatists and playwrights
20th-century French poets
French journalists
French film directors
Albert Londres Prize recipients
French Resistance members
Nazi concentration camp survivors
Special Air Service soldiers
French people of Italian descent
People of Piedmontese descent
Prix Fénéon winners
Monegasque people
French expatriates in Germany
French anarchists